Chalukou  is a station on Line 3 of Chongqing Rail Transit in Chongqing Municipality, China. It is located in Banan District. It opened as an infill station in 2013.

Station structure

References

Railway stations in Chongqing
Railway stations in China opened in 2013
Chongqing Rail Transit stations